Tyreomma is a genus of parasitic flies in the family Tachinidae.

Species
Tyreomma ciliata (Townsend, 1919)
Tyreomma muscinum Wulp, 1896

References

Dexiinae
Taxa named by Friedrich Moritz Brauer
Taxa named by Julius von Bergenstamm
Diptera of North America
Diptera of South America
Tachinidae genera